"Disparo al Corazón" is a song recorded by Puerto Rican singer Ricky Martin, released on January 13, 2015 as the second single from his Grammy Award–winning Spanish-language album, A Quien Quiera Escuchar (2015). It was written by Ricky Martin, Pedro Capó, Yoel Henriquez and Rafael Esparza Ruiz, and produced by Julio Reyes Copello.

Background and release
Martin started working on his tenth studio album in 2012. He released "Adiós" on September 23, 2014, as the lead single from the album, which was still untitled at the time. He revealed the album's title as A Quien Quiera Escuchar and track list in December 2014, with "Disparo al Corazón" being included as the second track. On January 8, 2015, it was announced that "Disparo al Corazón" would be a ballad and released to radio stations on January 12, 2015, as the second single from the album. The song was released for digital download and streaming by Sony Music Latin on January 13. During an interview with Billboard explained that the song was the favorite song of one his twin boys: "So maybe the boys influenced the choice of single." A remix featuring the Spanish producer Brian Cross was released simultaneously with the original song.

Music and lyrics

Musically, "Disparo al Corazón" is a Spanish language soft country pop ballad, that uses several instruments including guitar, piano, banjo, violin, and drum. The song was written by Rafael Esparza-Ruiz, Yoel Henriquez, Pedro Capó, and Martin. The production was handled by Julio Reyes Copello, and the track runs for a total of 3 minutes and 50 seconds. Lyrically, "Disparo al Corazón" which translates to "Shot to the Heart", is a metaphor full of "sensitivity, delivery, and honesty". The lyrics begin with, "Aquí va mi confesión / Antes de ti no fui un santo / He pecado como no / Pero eso es cosa del pasado / Desde que llegaste tú lanzaste al aire la moneda" (Here goes my confession / Before you I was not a saint / I have sinned, why not? / But that's a thing of the past / Since you arrived, you flipped the coin).

Critical reception
Upon release, "Disparo al Corazón" was met with widely positive reviews from music critics. In their review of the song, El Economista staff labeled Martin "one of the most admired artists on the world" and praised his "masterful interpretation" in the track. Andrew Le from Renowned for Sound described his vocals as "proficient". He highlighted "the unusually emotional instrumental ending, as the banjos, drums and strings lamentfully fade away into the distance" as the best part of the song. An author of ABC named the song "a full-fledged confession", stating that Martin "opened his heart and soul" in it. In 2020, MTV Argentina ranked it as one of the singer's best songs.

Accolades
"Disparo al Corazón" has received a number of awards and nominations. It was nominated for both Record of the Year and Song of the Year at the 16th Annual Latin Grammy Awards, but lost to "Hasta la Raíz" by Natalia Lafourcade in the categories.

Commercial performance
On January 19, 2015, "Disparo al Corazón" debuted at number thirty-four on the US Latin Airplay chart and at number nineteen on Latin Pop Airplay. Martin extended his lead for most top twenty hits on the Latin Pop Airplay to forty (followed by Enrique Iglesias with thirty-six). "Disparo al Corazón" also debuted at number thirty-five on Hot Latin Songs becoming Martin's forty-second hit on the chart. Additionally, the song opened at number seven on the US Latin Pop Digital Songs. Two weeks later, "Disparo al Corazón" also debuted at number twenty-three on the Tropical Songs chart. On February 16, 2015, "Disparo al Corazón" topped Latin Pop Airplay. So far, it spent four consecutive weeks at the top. The song also reached a new peak on Hot Latin Songs, climbing to number nine in its fifth week. On March 2, 2015, Martin earned his fourteenth Latin Airplay number one with "Disparo al Corazón." In the chart's history, only Enrique Iglesias boasted more leaders (twenty-six), and Gloria Estefan ranks third with eleven number ones.

Eventually, "Disparo al Corazón" peaked at number nine on the US Hot Latin Songs chart, number one on Latin Airplay and number twenty on Latin Digital Songs. It also reached number one on Latin Pop Airplay, number seven on Latin Pop Digital Songs, and number twelve on Tropical Songs. On the 2015 Billboard Year-End charts, "Disparo al Corazón" reached number fourteen on Latin Pop Songs, number forty-six on Latin Airplay, and number fifty-five on Hot Latin Songs.

The song peaked at number two on the Mexican Espanol Airplay chart and number ten on Mexico Airplay. In Spain, it reached number thirty-one.

Music video
The music video for "Disparo al Corazón" was released on Vevo on March 20, 2015.

Track listing

Credits and personnel 

Credits adapted from the liner notes of A Quien Quiera Escuchar.

Songwriting – Ricky Martin, Pedro Capó, Yoel Henriquez, Rafael Esparza Ruiz
Production – Julio Reyes Copello
Recording – Carlos Fernando López, Dan Warner, Guillermo Vadalá, Julio Reyes Copello, Lee Levin, Ricardo López Lalinde
Vocals engineering – Enrique Larreal 
Arrangement – Carlos Fernando López, Julio Reyes Copello, Ricardo López Lalinde
Strings arrangement – Carlos Fernando López, Julio Reyes Copello
Acoustic and electric guitar – Dan Warner
Banjo and triple – Ricardo López Lalinde
Bass – Guillermo Vadalá
Cello – Wells Cunningham
Drums – Lee Levin

Charts

Weekly charts

Year-end charts

Certifications

Release history

See also
List of Billboard Hot Latin Songs and Latin Airplay number ones of 2015

References

External links

2014 songs
2015 singles
Ricky Martin songs
Sony Music Latin singles
Songs written by Ricky Martin
Songs written by Rafael Esparza
Spanish-language songs
Pop ballads
Songs written by Yoel Henriquez
Songs written by Pedro Capó
Song recordings produced by Julio Reyes Copello